Polycarpa pomaria is a species of tunicate or sea squirt in the family Styelidae.

Description
The buccal siphon at the apex has four lobes and is surrounded by about 56 tentacles of various sizes. The atrial siphon is on the side and also has four lobes. The test or tunic is brown, wrinkled and leathery, with many fleshy papillae. Internally the body wall has numerous drop-shaped gonads (called polycarps) and the pharynx wall is perforated with many bands of stigmata (slits).

Distribution and habitat
Polycarpa pomaria is found in the northeastern Atlantic Ocean and the North Sea. Its range extends from Norway and Spitsbergen southwards to the Mediterranean Sea.

Biology
Like other sea squirts, Polycarpa pomaria feeds by drawing water in through its buccal siphon, filtering out the planktonic particles and expelling the water through its atrial siphon.

Polycarpa pomaria is viviparous and a few eggs at a time are fertilised within the atrium (body cavity) with sperm that is drawn in with the feeding current. The tadpole larvae lie quiescent as they develop inside the atrium but when they are expelled, they suddenly become active and very soon undergo metamorphosis into juveniles. Many undergo metamorphosis while still in the atrial chamber, and sometimes the whole batch does this.

References

Stolidobranchia
Animals described in 1816